Cameron Hall (born January 2, 1957 in Hamilton, Ontario) is a Canadian retired basketball player from Dundas, Ontario. He was a member of the Canadian Olympic basketball team in 1976. He played for the Duke Blue Devils in 1977 and 1978.

References 

1957 births
Living people
Basketball people from Ontario
Basketball players at the 1976 Summer Olympics
Canadian expatriate basketball people in the United States
Canadian men's basketball players
Duke Blue Devils men's basketball players
Olympic basketball players of Canada
Sportspeople from Hamilton, Ontario